Westgate is a residential neighbourhood in the southwest quadrant of Calgary, Alberta. It is bounded by Bow Trail to the north, 45 Street W to the east, 17 Avenue S to the south and Sarcee Trail to the west. Edworthy Park is located north of the community.

The area was annexed to the City of Calgary in 1956 and Westgate was established in 1957. It is represented in the Calgary City Council by the Ward 6 councillor.

Demographics

Residents in this community had a median household income of $54,309 in 2000, and there were 10.4% low income residents living in the neighbourhood. As of 2000, 14.2% of the residents were immigrants. A proportion of 14.6% of the buildings were condominiums or apartments, and 24.3% of the housing was used for renting.

Education
The community is served by Vincent Massey junior high  and Westgate Bilingual elementary public schools.

See also
List of neighbourhoods in Calgary

References

External links
Westgate Community Association
Federation of Calgary Communities: Westgate

Neighbourhoods in Calgary